The  is a railway line in southeastern Tokushima Prefecture, Japan, owned and operated by Shikoku Railway Company (JR Shikoku). It connects the prefectural capital of Tokushima with the town of Kaiyō in Kaifu District.

Services
The Muroto is a limited express service on the Mugi Line, which runs between Tokushima and Kaifu, once a day. In the past, the Home Express Anan ran between Tokushima and Anan. Between Mugi and Kaifu, all limited express trains are operated as local services.

There are trains that serve the Tokushima – Mugi, Tokushima – Kaifu, and Mugi – Kaifu sections, as well as a single round-trip between Tokushima and Anan. Some local trains have through service onto the Kōtoku, Tokushima, and Naruto lines. Driver-only operation is in effect for most daytime trains when there are few passengers.

Station list
 All stations are located in Tokushima Prefecture.
 Local trains stop at all stations. For the Muroto and Tsurugisan limited express services, see their respective articles.
 Trains can pass one another at stations marked "◇" and cannot pass at those marked "｜".

 Although the Tokushima and Naruto lines do not officially begin at Tokushima, most trains travel through on the Kōtoku Line to Tokushima.

History
The Awa Steamship Company, which operated a service between Honshu and Shikoku, first built an 11 km line from a port at Komatsushima to Tokushima which opened in 1913. In 1916, the line was extended by 10 km from Nakata to Furusho, resulting in the creation of the 2 km Komatsushima to Nakata branch line. The lines were nationalised the following year.

In 1936, the line was extended south from Hanoura 17 km to Kumano, and the 2 km Hanoura to Furusho section became a freight-only branch, which closed in 1961. The line was extended a further 35 km to Mugi in three stages opening between 1937 and 1942.

In 1959, it was decided to extend the line to Muroto, where it would connect with the planned extension of the Asa line from Kochi. The first 12 km section to Kaifu opened in 1973, and further construction undertaken until work was suspended in 1980.

The Chūden to Komatsushima branch closed in 1985.

In 1987, with the privatization of JNR, the line became part of the Shikoku Railway Company (JR Shikoku). 

In 1988 construction work south of Kaifu was recommenced by a private company underwritten by the Tokushima Prefectural Government, and the next section opened in 1992 as the Asa Kaigan Railway Asato Line.

Other significant dates

April 1, 1988: Muroto express service renamed Asa
November 3, 1990: Bunkanomori Station opens
November 21, 1990: Track upgrade allowing speeds up to 110 km/h completed; Three round-trip Uzushio limited express trains begin operation; Asa express service abolished
March 14, 1998: Tsurugisan limited express begins through operation onto the Mugi Line
March 13, 1999: Portion of Uzushio limited express operation separated, renamed Muroto
1 November 2020: JR Shikoku transferred a section in between Kaifu Station and Awa-Kainan Station to Asa Seaside Railway.

See also
 List of railway lines in Japan

References
This article incorporates material from the corresponding article in the Japanese Wikipedia.

External links

 JR Shikoku official website 

Mugi Line
Rail transport in Tokushima Prefecture
Railway lines opened in 1913
1067 mm gauge railways in Japan
1913 establishments in Japan